Maulvi Muhammad Qasim Khalid is an Afghan Taliban politician who is currently serving as Governor of Kunar province since 21 September 2021.

References

Living people
Taliban governors
Governors of Kunar Province
Year of birth missing (living people)